Union Community School District is a rural public school district headquartered in La Porte City, Iowa.

It is located in sections of Benton, Black Hawk, and Tama counties. In addition to La Porte City it also serves Dysart and Mount Auburn.

The district was established on July 1, 1993, by the merger of the La Porte City Community School District and the Dysart-Geneseo Community School District.

Schools
 Union High School
 Union Middle School
 On April 11, 2021, Mark Albertsen, the principal, agreed to resign.
 La Porte City Elementary School
 Dysart-Geneseo Elementary School

Enrollment

See also
List of school districts in Iowa

References

External links
 Union Community School District

School districts in Iowa
Education in Benton County, Iowa
Education in Black Hawk County, Iowa
Education in Tama County, Iowa
1993 establishments in Iowa
School districts established in 1993